Channel One News is a Hindi-language 24/7 news television channel, owned by Pal News Media Private Limited. The channel launched in June 2009 and is available across all major cable and DTH platforms and online.

References

Hindi-language television channels in India
Television channels and stations established in 2015
Hindi-language television stations
Television stations in India
2015 establishments in Uttar Pradesh